Dr. Lamb (羔羊醫生) is a 1992 Hong Kong horror crime film directed by Danny Lee and Billy Tang. The film stars Lee, Simon Yam and Kent Cheng. Dr Lamb was rated Category III by the  Hong Kong motion picture rating system. The film is allegedly based on a true crime that took place in 1982 (Hong Kong's serial killer, Lam Kor-wan).

Plot

Cast
 Danny Lee as Inspector Lee
 Simon Yam as Lam Gor-yue
 Kent Cheng as Fat Bing
 Lau Siu-ming as Lam Gor-yue's father
 Parkman Wong as Bully Hung
 Emily Kwan as Bo
 Perrie Lai as Lam's stepsister
 Chung Bik-wing as Chan Kit-fong
 Wong Wing-fong as Chau Sau-lan
 Julie Lee as Leung Man-lung
 Eric Kei as Eric
 King Kong Lam as KK
 Ma Lee
 Hui Sze-man as Lam's stepmother
 Amy Wong as Lam's ex-girlfriend
 Chan Yin-yung as Daughter of Lam's stepsister

Release

Home media
Dr. Lamb was released on DVD by Ingram Entertainment on April 30, 2002.

Reception

HorrorNews.net gave the film a mixed review, writing, "Dr. Lamb skips back and forth between brutal violence that is seriously treated, and ridiculously over-the-top, even slapsticky sequences that seem out-of-place in what is meant to be a crime film based on a true story."
Joey O'Bryan of The Austin Chronicle awarded the film three out of five stars, stating, "A film that pushes the limits of bad taste in several key scenes, Dr. Lamb is a slick, and sick, exploitation item that both repels the viewer with its images of disturbing, misogynistic violence, in addition to tickling them with repulsive black humor à la early John Waters."

References

External links
 
 
 

1992 films
1992 horror films
1992 crime thriller films
Hong Kong horror thriller films
Hong Kong crime thriller films
Hong Kong serial killer films
Crime horror films
1990s exploitation films
Hong Kong splatter films
Police detective films
Films directed by Billy Tang
Crime films based on actual events
Films set in Hong Kong
Films shot in Hong Kong
Hong Kong slasher films
1990s Cantonese-language films
1990s Hong Kong films